The 1982 season was the original Tampa Bay Rowdies eighth season of existence, and their eighth season in the North American Soccer League, the then-top division of soccer in the United States and Canada. In the 1982 season, the Rowdies finished third in the Southern Division, failing to qualify for the playoffs for the first time in franchise history. Brazilian striker, Luís Fernando lead the club in scoring, with 16 goals in the regular season and 25 across all competitions.

Club

Roster

Management and technical staff 
Gordon Jago began the season as head coach but stepped down the day after a 2–1 loss to the Chicago Sting on July 7. Although Al Miller was immediately named as Jago's successor, assistant coach Kevin Keelan served as the interim head coach for one match at San Diego on July 10. Miller joined the team the following day. Keelan also filled in as coach on July 31, during the Sunshine International Series, while Miller attended his daughter's wedding in Dallas. Other members of the staff included the team's trainer, Ken Shields and equipment manager, Alfredo Beronda.

 George W. Strawbridge, Jr., owner
 Ted Moore, general manager
 Francisco Marcos, director of player personal 
 Gordon Jago, head coach (resigned July 7)
 Kevin Keelan, head coach (interim)
 Al Miller, head coach (began July 11)
 Ken Shields, trainer
 Alfredo Beronda, equipment manager

Honors 
Three Rowdies received individual honors following the 1982 NASL season. 
 NASL Rookie of the Year: Pedro DeBrito
 NASL All-Star, First Team: Peter Nogly
 NASL All-Star, Honorable Mention: Mike Connell

Competitions

Preseason friendlies 
Tampa Bay finished their preseason exhibition schedule undefeated with three victories over other NASL teams, one victory over an NCAA Division I squad, one victory over an NCAA Division II squad, and a draw versus the Honduras National Team as that squad prepared for the upcoming 1982 FIFA World Cup.

Preseason results

Other friendlies

North American Soccer League 
The Rowdies finished the regular season with 112 points placing them in 3rd place out of four teams in the Southern Division, and 12th out of 14 teams in the league overall. It also marked the first time Tampa Bay failed to qualify for the NASL playoffs in eight seasons. Predictably, as the losses mounted attendance dipped, with only a handful of home games reaching the 20,000 mark. Two of those were rivalry games against Fort Lauderdale and New York. One match was followed by a massive Fourth of July fireworks display, while another preceded a free concert featuring music legends, Chuck Berry and The Drifters. The remaining 20,000+ crowd showed up for the opening night of the season.

Regular-season standings

Regular season results

Sunshine International Series 
The Sunshine International Series was the first international competition to use the NASL’s point system to determine the standings. As such, teams were awarded six points for wins in regulation or overtime, four points for a shoot–out win, and up to three bonus points for each goal scored in regulation.  All four teams faced one another. The Rowdies netted four goals and were winless in the series. On the final day of the competition a double header was played at Tampa Stadium with all four teams in action, followed by a concert featuring country-pop crossover singer, Crystal Gayle.

Series standings

Series results

Statistics

Player movement

See also 

 1982 North American Soccer League season
 1982 in American soccer
 Tampa Bay Rowdies (1975–1993)

References 

 1982 Rowdies results

Tampa Bay Rowdies
1982
Tampa Bay Rowdies (1975–1993) seasons
Tampa Bay Rowdies
Tampa Bay Rowdies
Sports in Tampa, Florida